The 2017 Giro d'Italia began on 5 May, and stage 21 will occur on 28 May.

Stage 12
18 May 2017 — Forlì to Reggio Emilia,

Stage 13
19 May 2017 — Reggio Emilia to Tortona,

Stage 14
20 May 2017 — Castellania to Santuario di Oropa,

Stage 15
21 May 2017 — Valdengo to Bergamo,

Stage 16
23 May 2017 — Rovetta to Bormio,

Stage 17
24 May 2017 — Tirano to Canazei,

Stage 18
25 May 2017 — Moena to Ortisei/St. Ulrich,

Stage 19
26 May 2017 — Innichen/San Candido to Piancavallo

Stage 20
27 May 2017 — Pordenone to Asiago,

Stage 21
28 May 2017 — Monza (Autodromo) to Milan,  individual time trial (ITT)

References

Sources

 

2017 Giro d'Italia
Giro d'Italia stages